Iceland competed at the 2002 Winter Olympics in Salt Lake City, United States.  They did not win any medals.

Alpine skiing

Men

Women

Women's combined

References
Official Olympic Reports
 Olympic Winter Games 2002, full results by sports-reference.com

Nations at the 2002 Winter Olympics
2002 Winter Olympics
Winter Olympics